Sir William Calvert (3 May 1761) was a British politician.

Educated at Emmanuel College, Cambridge, he was a Member of Parliament (MP) for the City of London in 1742–1754, Lord Mayor of London in 1748–1749, and an MP for Old Sarum in 1755–1761.

References 

Alumni of Emmanuel College, Cambridge
18th-century lord mayors of London
Members of the Parliament of Great Britain for English constituencies
British MPs 1741–1747
British MPs 1747–1754
British MPs 1754–1761

Masters of the Worshipful Company of Brewers

1700s births

1761 deaths

Year of birth uncertain